Mohamed Amine Essahel (born 17 February 2003) is a Moroccan professional footballer who plays as a midfielder for Mohammed VI Academy.

Professional career
Essahel is a youth product of Mohammed VI Football Academy, where he was considered one of their best prospects. Essahel joined the Belgian club Eupen on loan on 31 August 2021. He made his professional debut with Eupen in a 2–0 Belgian First Division A loss to Cercle Brugge on 16 January 2022.

International career
Essahel is a youth international for Morocco, having represented the Morocco U17s, and U20s.

References

External links
 

2003 births
Living people
Footballers from Strasbourg
Moroccan footballers
Morocco youth international footballers
Belgian Pro League players
K.A.S. Eupen players
Association football midfielders
Moroccan expatriate footballers
Moroccan expatriates in Belgium
Expatriate footballers in Belgium